Major General Lucien Abraham (February 1, 1902 – June 11, 1960) was an American educator who served as the Adjutant General of Arkansas from 1953 to 1955.

Coaching career
Lucien Abraham was the head football coach at Arkansas College (present-day Lyon College) at Batesville in 1935.

Military service
During World War II, Abraham served with the 153d Infantry, Alaskan Department, in the Aleutian Islands. In January 1953, he was appointed Adjutant General of Arkansas by Governor Francis Cherry. In December 1953, Abraham was promoted to the State grade of major general in the Arkansas Army National Guard.

References

External links

 

1902 births
1960 deaths
Adjutants General of Arkansas
Lyon Scots football coaches
National Guard (United States) generals
Ouachita Baptist Tigers baseball players
Ouachita Baptist Tigers football players
People from Arkadelphia, Arkansas
Schoolteachers from Arkansas
United States Army personnel of World War II